Vladislav Lalicki (1 June 1935 – 29 December 2008), also known as "Wladyslaw Lalitzky", was a Serbian production designer, costume designer, and painter.

Lalicki has worked with Šabac National Theatre since 1958, Atelje 212 Theatre in Belgrade since 1961, Yugoslav Drama Theatre since 1965. He worked with theatres in United States, the former USSR and Poland and with many theatres and theatre groups in the former Yugoslavia. Vladislav Lalicki was production/costume designer for over 500 theatre plays, 200 TV shows and numerous movies. He also provided more than 500 books with illustrations.

Lalicki spent most of his life in Belgrade, but he also spent 18 years (1984–2002) in Johannesburg, South Africa, where he influenced South African art. Many of his paintings are located in the Johannesburg Museum and the Everard Read Art Gallery.

He was married twice and had four children.  He died in Belgrade and was buried in Alley of Distinguished Citizens in Novo groblje in the city.

Member of
ULUPUDS The Applied Artists and Designers Association of Serbia"
SPID-YU "Federation of Association of Applied Arts Artists and Designers of Yugoslavia"
ICSID "International Council of Societies of Industrial Design"
ICOGRADA "International Council of Graphic Design Association"
WCC "World Crafts Council"
AIC "Academie Internationale dela Céramique"

Filmography as production/costume designer
Doktorka na selu (1982) TV Series
Kante ili kese (1982) (TV)
Kir Janja (1981) (TV)
Deset najlepsih dana (1980) (TV)
Telegram (1980) (TV)
Tren (1980) (mini) TV Series
Sumnjivo lice (1979) (TV)
Cardak ni na nebu ni na zemlji (1978) TV Series
Maska (1978) (TV)
Sedam sekretara SKOJ-a (1978) (mini) TV Series
Marija Magdalena (1977) (TV)
Poseta stare dame (1976) (TV)
Prica o vojniku (1976)
Testament (1975)
Obesenjak (1974) (TV)
Kralj Ibi (1973) (TV)
Proslava (1973) (TV)
Celava pevacica (1972) (TV)
Gradjani sela Luga (1972) TV Series
Nesporazum (1972) (TV)
Sami bez andjela (1972) (TV)
Slava i san (1972) (TV)
Sladak zivot na srpski nacin (1971) (TV)
Levaci (1970) TV Series
Evgenija na zrnu graska (1968) (TV)
Kad golubovi polete (1968)
Martin Krpan s vrha (1968) (TV)
Prijateljstvo, zanat najstariji (1968) (TV)
Sirota Marija (1968)
Zanati (1968) TV Series
Eci, pec, pec (1961)
Pedagoska bajka (1961)

Awards
Work Life Award "Petar Pasic"  (2004)
BIENNALE DE PARIS (1961)
Award "Sterija Popovic" for costume design  (1981)
Special Award "Sterija Popovic" for theatre play "Bele rakete lete na Amsterdam" (1973)
1st prize for production design of "Tri para hozn tregera" theatre play in Leskovac (1970)
Golden Laurel Crown in Sarajevo (1968)
Golden Laurel Crown in Sarajevo (1963)
November award of city Šabac for theatre play "Fuente Ovehuna, Zlatni pijesak" (1958)
November award of city Šabac for design "Fuente Ovehuna, Zlatni pijesak" (1958)
1st prize on "Susreti Vojvodjanskih Pozorista"
1st prize on "ULUPUS Spring Salon" for design
1st award on "Oktobarski Salon za Slikarstvo"
1st award on "Oktobarski Salon za Slikarstvo"
1st award on "Lutkarski Festival Jugoslavije"

References

Sources

External links

1935 births
2008 deaths
Costume designers
Serbian production designers
Artists from Šabac
20th-century Serbian painters
Serbian male painters
20th-century Serbian male artists